General elections were held in Belgium on 26 May 1929. The result was a victory for the Catholic Party, which won 71 of the 187 seats in the Chamber of Representatives. Voter turnout was 94.0%.

The incumbent Catholic-Liberal government led by Henri Jaspar continued after the election.

Results

Chamber of Representatives

Senate

References

Belgium
1920s elections in Belgium
1929 in Belgium
May 1929 events